The Town Belt is a green belt which surrounds the centre of the New Zealand city of Dunedin. The fourth side of the central city is bounded by the Otago Harbour.

One of the world's oldest green belts, the Town Belt was planned in Scotland at the time of the advent of the Otago settlement in 1848. Residential areas outside the belt became separate boroughs, and were not amalgamated with Dunedin until much later. The town belt now forms a break between the city's inner and outer suburbs. The belt was originally a combination of native bush and scrubland, but is now largely replanted forest and open parkland. Many species of plant can be found in the belt, including tree fuchsia, lemonwood, lancewood, manuka, and broadleaf, and the forested area is home to many species of birds, including some uncommon and endangered species such as the kererū, eastern rosella, bellbird, tomtit, tūī, rifleman, morepork, and shining cuckoo, and kōtare.

A long, narrow road, Queens Drive, winds along much of the length of the belt and provides easy access to it for Dunedinites. Queens Drive is linked to many of the city's main streets, including Stuart Street and High Street. Numerous walkways lead through the bush and parks, and the belt is a popular recreation area for Dunedinites.

The Town Belt includes many open areas and parks, including the Kensington Oval, Dunedin Southern Cemetery, Montecillo Ground, Unity Park, Mornington Ground, Jubilee Park, Belleknowes Golf Course, Robin Hood Park, Littlebourne Ground, Prospect Park, Woodhaugh Gardens, the North Ground, Dunedin Botanic Gardens, Dunedin Northern Cemetery, Logan Park, and the University Oval.

Notable buildings and structures in the belt include Moana Pool, Olveston, Otago Boys' High School, and the Beverly-Begg Observatory.

References

Geography of Dunedin
Tourist attractions in Dunedin
Parks in Dunedin
Green belts
Urban forests in New Zealand